Simbu Angra FC, sometimes spelled Chimbu Angra FC, is a semi-professional association football club based in Chimbu Province, Papua New Guinea. The club was founded in 2019.

The club took part in the 2019 edition of the Papua New Guinea National Soccer League, finishing bottom of the Highlands Conference.

History 
The team was announced as competing in the 2019 Papua New Guinea National Soccer League in January 2019, with the side consisting of players from Madang, Morobe and Chimbu provinces. Before the season kicked off, the only players with previous NSL experience were captain Murphy Yomi, vice-captain Cornelius Aris, Isaac Lalo and Dennis Gira.

The side started the season strongly, losing just one of their five games in the first half of the season – after three straight draws, they lost 6–2 to Kagua-Erave, before a Nalon Nalon penalty saw them edge past Aporo Mai 1–0. At the halfway stage, the teams sat fourth in the conference table. The second half of the season was poor, though, with the side losing all five of their matches, including a 10–4 defeat against Blue Kumuls. The team therefore finished sixth out of six teams in the regional conference.

Domestic record

National competitions 

 Papua New Guinea National Soccer League
 2019: Highlands Conference: 6th

Current squad

References 

Football clubs in Papua New Guinea
Association football clubs established in 2019
2019 establishments in Papua New Guinea